Bække is a town in Vejen Municipality, Southern Denmark.

Bække grew up around the road between Ribe and Vejle. The road roughly follows the course of the historic Hærvejen or Ox Road past the church and inn. At an early stage the city extended along the old road and another parallel to the main street. The city currently has a compact form.

By 1917, Bække had a station on the Troldhede to Kolding railway. The railway closed in 1969, but the town still has significance as a hub for bus services.  The church, school and most shops are in the middle of the city linked to the main street, Søndergade-Nørregade.

In recent years Bække has experienced an increase in tourism, based on the Hærvejen route and the river Holme Å.  The square at the bus station has also been redeveloped with a modern sculpture by Niels Aage Schmidt symbolizing the Hærvejen.

Bække has distinctive historic architecture with several landmark buildings.

References

External links 

 Vejen Municipality

Cities and towns in the Region of Southern Denmark
Vejen Municipality